54 is an album of Metropole Orkest conducted by Vince Mendoza featuring jazz guitarist John Scofield, and was released in May 2010.

In the 53rd Annual Grammy Awards, this album was nominated to Best Large Jazz Ensemble Album, and Best Instrumental Arrangement went to Vince Mendoza for arranging "Carlos", the opening track of this album.

Track listing

"Carlos" (John Scofield, arranged by Vince Mendoza) – 9:00
"Jung Parade" (Vince Mendoza) – 7:38
"Polo Towers" (John Scofield, arranged by Vince Mendoza) – 6:53
"Honest I Do" (John Scofield, arranged by Vince Mendoza) – 4:25
"Twang" (John Scofield, arranged by Vince Mendoza) – 9:24
"Imaginary Time" (John Scofield, arranged by Florian Ross) – 6:21
"Peculiar" (John Scofield, arranged by Vince Mendoza) – 7:40
"Say We Did" (Vince Mendoza) – 8:30
"Out Of The City" (John Scofield, arranged by Jim McNeely) – 5:34

Personnel
John Scofield – guitar
Metropole Orkest
Conductor – Vince Mendoza
Trumpet – Erik Veldkamp, Jan Hollander, Jelle Schouten, Ruud Breuls
Saxophone, Clarinet – Jos Beeren, Leo Janssen, Marc Scholten, Max Boeree, Paul van der Feen
Flute – Janine Abbas, Mariël van den Bos
Trombone – Bart van Lier, Jan Bastiani, Jan Oosting
French horn – Pieter Hunfeld
Bass trombone – Martin van den Berg
Oboe – Willem Luijt
Piano – Hans Vroomans
Guitar – Peter Tiehuis
Bass – Aram Kersbergen
Drums – Martijn Vink
Percussion – Eddy Koopman, Murk Jiskoot
Violin [1st Violin] – Alida Schat, Arlia de Ruiter, David Peijnenborgh, Denis Koenders, Erica Korthals Altes, Feyona van Iersel, Pauline Terlouw, Seija Teeuwen
Violin [2nd Violin] – Elizabeth Liefkes-Cats, Herman van Haaren, Lucja Domski, Marianne van den Heuvel, Merijn Rombout, Vera van der Bie, Wim Kok 
Viola – Iris Schut, Isabella Petersen, Julia Jowett, Mieke Honingh, Norman Jansen
Cello – Annie Tangberg, Bastiaan van der Werf, Emile Visser, Jascha Albracht
Contrabass – Arend Liefkes, Erik Winkelmann, Tjerk de Vos
Harp – Joke Schonewille

References

2010 albums